Warne Marion Marsh (October 26, 1927 – December 18, 1987) was an American tenor saxophonist. Born in Los Angeles, his playing first came to prominence in the 1950s as a protégé of pianist Lennie Tristano and earned attention in the 1970s as a member of Supersax.

Biography
Marsh came from an affluent artistic background: his father was Hollywood cinematographer Oliver T. Marsh (1892–1941), and his mother Elizabeth was a violinist. He was the nephew of actresses Mae Marsh and Marguerite Marsh and film editor Frances Marsh.

He was tutored by Lennie Tristano. Marsh was often recorded in the company of other Cool School musicians, and remained one of the most faithful to the Tristano philosophy of improvisation – the faith in the purity of the long line, the avoidance of licks and emotional chain-pulling, the concentration on endlessly mining the same small body of jazz standards. While Marsh was a generally cool-toned player, the critic Scott Yanow notes that Marsh played with "more fire than one would expect" in certain contexts.

Marsh's rhythmically subtle lines are immediately recognizable. He has been called by Anthony Braxton "the greatest vertical improviser" (i.e., improvising that emphasizes harmony/chords more than melody). In the 1970s, he gained renewed exposure as a member of Supersax, a large ensemble which played orchestral arrangements of Charlie Parker solos. Marsh also recorded one of his most celebrated albums, All Music, with the Supersax rhythm section during this period.

Marsh died of a heart attack onstage at the Los Angeles club Donte's in 1987, in the middle of playing the tune "Out of Nowhere". He left a widow, Geraldyne Marsh, and two sons, K.C. Marsh and Jason Marsh. He is interred at Forest Lawn Memorial Park in Glendale, California.

Though he remains something of a cult figure among jazz fans and musicians, his influence has grown since his death; younger players such as Mark Turner have borrowed from his music as a way of counterbalancing the pervasive influence of John Coltrane.  Marsh's discography remains somewhat scattered and elusive, as much of it was done for small labels, but more and more of his work has been issued on compact disc in recent years.

A documentary is being made about him: Warne Marsh: An Improvised Life, directed by his eldest son, K.C. Marsh.

Discography

As leader/co-leader
 Live in Hollywood (Xanadu, 1952 [1979])
Lee Konitz with Warne Marsh (Atlantic, 1955) with Lee Konitz
 Jazz of Two Cities (Imperial, 1956) also released as The Winds of Marsh
 Art Pepper with Warne Marsh (Contemporary, 1956 [1986]) with Art Pepper
The Right Combination (Riverside, 1957) with Joe Albany
 Music for Prancing (Mode, 1957)
 Warne Marsh (Atlantic, 1958)
The Art of Improvising (Revelation, 1959 [1974])
The Art of Improvising Volume 2 (Revelation, 1959 [1977])
 Release Record Send Tape (Wave, 1959-60 [1969])
 Jazz from the East Village (Wave, 1960 [1969])
 Ne Plus Ultra (Revelation, 1969)
 Report of the 1st Annual Symposium on Relaxed Improvisation (Revelation, 1972) with Clare Fischer and Gary Foster
 Warne Marsh Quintet: Jazz Exchange Vol. 1 (Storyville, 1975 [1976]) with Lee Konitz
 Live at the Montmartre Club: Jazz Exchange Vol. 2 (Storyville, 1975 [1977]) with Lee Konitz
 Warne Marsh Lee Konitz: Jazz Exchange Vol. 3 (Storyville, 1975 [1985]) with Lee Konitz
 The Unissued 1975 Copenhagen Studio Recordings (Storyville, 1975 [1997])
 The Unissued Copenhagen Studio Recordings (Storyville, 1975 [1997])
 All Music (Nessa, 1976)
Lee Konitz Meets Warne Marsh Again (Pausa, 1976) with Lee Konitz
 Tenor Gladness (Discomate, 1976) with Lew Tabackin
 Warne Out (Interplay, 1977)
 Apogee (Warner Bros., 1978) with Pete Christlieb
 Conversations with Warne Volume 1 (Criss Cross, 1978 [1991]) with Pete Christlieb
Conversations with Warne Volume 2 (Criss Cross Jazz, 1978 [1991]) with Pete Christlieb
 How Deep, How High (Interplay, 1976/79 [1980]) with Sal Mosca
 I Remember You... (Spotlite, 1980) with Karin Krog and Red Mitchell
 Star Highs (Criss Cross Jazz, 1982)
 Warne Marsh Meets Gary Foster (East Wind, 1982) with Gary Foster
 A Ballad Album (Criss Cross, 1983) with Lou Levy
 Posthumous (Interplay, 1985 [1987]) released with additional tracks as Newly Warne (Storyville, 1985 [1989])
 Ballad for You (Interplay, 1985 [1995]) with Susan Chen
 Warne Marsh & Susan Chen (Interplay, 1985 [1987]) with Susan Chen
 Back Home (Criss Cross, 1986)
 Two Days in the Life of... (Interplay, 1987)
 Red Mitchell/Warne Marsh Big Two (Storyville, 1987)
 Live at the Montmartre Club: Jazz Exchange, Vol. 3 (Storyville, 1987)
 For the Time Being (Hot Club, 1990)
 Live at Montmartre, Vol. 3 (Storyville, 1995)
 Red Mitchell-Warne Marsh Big Two, Vol. 2 (Storyville, 1998)
 I Got a Good One for You (Storyville, 2000)
 Live in Las Vegas, 1962 (Naked City Jazz, 2000)
 Personnel Statement (3D, 2002)
 Marshlands (Storyville, 2003)
 Final Interplay (Why Not, 2004)
 Duo Live at Sweet Basil 1980 (Fresh Sound, 2004)
 Berlin 1980 (Gambit, 2006)
 In Copenhagen (Storyville, 2007)

As co-leader/sideman
With Elek Bacsik
 Bird and Dizzy – a Musical Tribute (Flying Dutchman, 1875)
With Chet Baker
 Blues for a Reason (Criss Cross Jazz, 1985)
With Bill Evans
 Crosscurrents (Fantasy, 1977) 
With Clare Fischer
 Thesaurus (Atlantic, 1969)
With Lee Konitz
 Subconscious-Lee (Prestige, 1950)
 Live at the Half Note (Verve, 1959 [1994]) 
 Lee Konitz Meets Jimmy Giuffre (Verve, 1959)

References

Further reading
Chamberlain, Safford (2000). An Unsung Cat: The Life and Music of Warne Marsh. Scarecrow Press. 
Cook, Richard & Morton, Brian (2003). The Penguin Guide to Jazz Recordings (8th edn). Penguin. 
Cornelius, Marcus M (2002).  Out of Nowhere – The musical life of Warne Marsh.  Aurora Nova Publishing.

External links
Fan page for documentary, "Warne Marsh: An Improvised Life"
http://www.warnemarsh.info – The Warne Marsh Web Site with a comprehensive discography, etc.
http://auroranovapublishing.net – Web Site for Aurora Nova Publishing and the works of Marcus M. Cornelius
https://www.johnklopotowski.com/book-preview – Memoirs and studies drawn from experiences as a student of Warne Marsh, 1982–1987. (John Klopotowski)

1927 births
1987 deaths
Cool jazz saxophonists
American male saxophonists
Musicians who died on stage
Xanadu Records artists
Criss Cross Jazz artists
Nessa Records artists
Hot Club Records artists
Musicians from Los Angeles
20th-century American saxophonists
Burials at Forest Lawn Memorial Park (Glendale)
20th-century American male musicians
American male jazz musicians
Storyville Records artists
Supersax members